Dolores Brenda Harding (née Mantey; 17 October 1936 – 30 November 2012), known professionally as Dolores Mantez, was a British television actress of the 1960s and early 1970s, best known for her appearances in Gerry Anderson's science-fiction TV series UFO.

Life and career
Harding was born in Liverpool to a Ghanaian father and an Irish mother. She changed her birth surname of "Mantey" by one letter and initially followed a career as a seamstress in a dress shop. She then started to sing semi-professionally, an occupation that became a full-time job when she joined a group that appeared in cabaret. However, while she was visiting her agent, she happened to meet an actor's agent who believed that her exotic physical appearance was exactly what was needed for a role as a student in Sapphire (1959), a film about the emerging Afro-Caribbean community in England. At the time, Mantez had no acting experience, but her work on the film resulted in a succession of parts in television series such as Shadow Squad and The Avengers. She also played a small role as a nurse in the film The Angry Silence (1960) starring Richard Attenborough.

Mantez's acting career was boosted with a role as a nurse in the film Life for Ruth (1962), co-starring Patrick McGoohan. This in turn led to appearances in two episodes of the TV series Danger Man, first as an agent working with John Drake in "Loyalty Always Pays", and then as a West Indian woman in "The Man on the Beach". She appeared as artist Rita Bell in an episode of the ABC series The Human Jungle ("The Twenty-Four Hour Man", 1964). Another of Mantez's roles was as Happy Lee, the girl suspected of Marty Hopkirk's murder in the pilot episode of the ITC series Randall and Hopkirk (Deceased) ("My Late Lamented Friend and Partner", 1969). During the 1960s, Mantez appeared in a number of stage musicals; these included Cowardy Custard (the Mermaid Theatre's tribute to Noël Coward), Monty Norman's The Perils of Scobie Prilt, and the West End production of Every Other Evening (starring Margaret Lockwood). She toured Europe, once appearing in Porgy And Bess in East Berlin. She may be best known for her portrayal of Lieutenant Nina Barry (frequently sporting a purple wig, as did all female staff on Moonbase) in the science-fiction TV series UFO, broadcast in 1970 and 1971. Her final acting role was as Indigo Jones, a mixed-race lady of means, in an episode of the BBC series The Onedin Line ("Fetch and Carry", 1972).

Personal life
In the mid-1970s, Mantez met businessman Robert Harding in a pub. They married in 1976. After their son Robert Jr. ("Robbie") was born, Mantez gave up acting. She died on 30 November 2012 following a short illness, aged 76.

Filmography

References

External links

Lieutenant Nina Barry profile

1936 births
2012 deaths
20th-century English actresses
20th-century English singers
Actresses from Liverpool
English film actresses
English musical theatre actresses
English people of Ghanaian descent
English people of Irish descent
English television actresses
Musicians from Liverpool
20th-century English women singers
20th-century British businesspeople